Gorama is a monotypic snout moth genus described by Francis Walker in 1866. Its single species, Gorama strenuella, was described by the same person in the same year, and is known from the Sula Islands.

References

Phycitinae
Monotypic moth genera
Moths of Indonesia